Glutamate [NMDA] receptor subunit 3B is a protein that in humans is encoded by the GRIN3B gene.

See also
 NMDA receptor

References

Further reading

External links 
 

Ionotropic glutamate receptors